Donald or Don McCormick may refer to:

 Donald McCormick (1911–1998), British journalist and historian
 Donald B. McCormick (born 1932), American biochemist and nutritionist
 Donald McCormick (footballer), English footballer
 Don McCormick (born 1945), Canadian tennis player

See also
 Donald MacCormick (1939–2009), Scottish broadcast journalist
 Don McCormack (born 1955), American baseball player and coach